Drakulić is a village in the municipality of Banja Luka, Republika Srpska, Bosnia and Herzegovina.

History
In February 1942, the Ustaše under Miroslav Filipović's command massacred 2,300 adults and 550 children in the Serb-populated villages of Drakulić, Motike and Šargovac. The children were chosen as the first victims and their body parts were cut off.

References

Villages in Republika Srpska
Populated places in Banja Luka